Events in the year 1915 in Portugal.

Incumbents
President:  Manuel de Arriaga (until 26 May), Teófilo Braga (from 29 May to 5 August), Bernardino Machado (from 6 August)
Prime Minister: Victor Hugo de Azevedo Coutinho (until 25 January), Joaquim Pimenta de Castro (from 25 January to 14 May), Revolutionary Junta (from 14 to 15 May), João Pinheiro Chagas (from 15 to 17 May), José de Castro (from 17 May to 29 November), Afonso Costa (from 29 November)

Events
14 May - May 14 Revolt
13 June - Legislative election
8 August - Establishment of the Catholic Centre Party.

Arts and entertainment
21 April - Establishment of the Theatre Circo

Sport
25 December - Establishment of Varzim S.C.

Births
5 February - Tereza de Arriaga, painter
28 February - António da Mota Veiga, politician, law professor
5 April - Rafael Correia, footballer
29 April - Francisco Moreira, footballer
11 May - Aníbal Paciência, footballer (born in Angola)
10 July - João Azevedo, footballer
7 August  - Mariano Amaro, footballer
18 August - Manuel Guimarães, filmmaker
31 October  - João Cruz, footballer
26 November - Margarida de Abreu, choreographer
29 December - Alberto Gomes, footballer

Deaths
27 September - Ramalho Ortigão, writer

References

 
Portugal
Years of the 20th century in Portugal
Portugal